Howie & Landau, also known as Hongmao and Lantu, is a Chinese animated series in mainland China. The series is produced by "Hunan Greatdreams Cartoon Communications Limited". They are most commonly referred to as "Hongmao" and "Lantu", or "Howie" and "Landau". The show uses a combination of 2D animation and CGI.

Background
Their first show was produced in 2004 by the Great Dreams Cartoon (宏梦卡通), who was unable to finish the whole series (originally 100+ in the plan, while only the first 10 of which are actually produced).

Characters
Howie (Hongmao/虹猫） - male red cat
Landau (Lantu/蓝兔） - female blue rabbit
Sally （Sha Li/莎莉） - female pink squirrel
Tease (Dou Dou/逗逗） - male brown dog
Big Ben (Daben/大奔） - male polar bear
Jumper (Tiao-tiao/跳跳） - male brown monkey
Dada （达达） - male panda bear

Overall

 Sample Cartoons
11 eps (originally intended to have over 100) for Explore the Space with Hongmao and Lantu 
84 eps for Howie & Landau's Humorous Theatre 
65 eps for Howie & Landau's Cartoon Happy World 
95 eps for Howie & Landau's Happy Moments 
84 eps for Howie & Landau's You Asked Me 
80 eps for Howie & Landau's Fairy Tales Adventures 
80 eps for Howie & Landau's Happy Literacy 
47 eps for Howie & Landau's Happy Chi Qu Yuan 
100 eps for Howie & Landau's Universe 
90 eps for Howie & Landau's Dinosaurs 
52 eps for Howie & Landau: Seabed Adventures 
56 eps for Howie & Landau: Dream Adventures 
52 eps for Howie & Landau: Austrian Adventures 
52 eps for Howie & Landau Sidequels: Tiao-tiao the Guardian

References

2005 Chinese television series debuts
2000s animated television series
2000s animated comedy television series
China Central Television original programming
Chinese animated television series
Television shows set in China
Animated television series about cats
Animated television series about rabbits and hares